Nia Roberts is a Welsh radio and television presenter.

Early life 
Roberts was born to Mabel (d. 1996) and J.O. Roberts (d. 2016), a Welsh actor, and was raised in the village of Benllech on Anglesey. Her brother is the television presenter Gareth Roberts.

Career 
She is one of the best known faces on Welsh channel S4C regularly fronting competitions, festivals and shows (including her own chat show Nia) for the channel. Her television credits include presenting prime-time search for the best choir in Wales, Côr Cymru and anchoring coverage of the National Eisteddfod of Wales and the arts & culture programme Pethe. Since 2015 she has presented the S4C quiz Celwydd Noeth (Blatant Lie).

She hosted her own weekday morning magazine programme for BBC Radio Cymru moving to the afternoon in 2012, but the programme came to end in December 2013 after a new schedule was introduced. Since then she has presented the weekly arts programme Stiwdio.

Personal life 
Roberts lives in Cowbridge with her husband Geraint and has two daughters, Nel and Cesia, who both speak fluent Welsh and English.

She was previously known as Nia Chiswell while married to singer and TV producer Huw Chiswell.

References

Welsh television presenters
Welsh women television presenters
Welsh radio presenters
Welsh women radio presenters
Living people
Welsh-language television presenters
Year of birth missing (living people)